Olimpiku Stadium is a purpose-built stadium in Yrshek, Kashar, Tiranë, Albania. The stadium was reconstructed in 2011 with the investment coming from the club's president Kujtim Beqiri.

References 

Buildings and structures in Tirana
Football venues in Albania